Greenbrier College was a women's college in Lewisburg, West Virginia in the United States from 1812 to 1972. It started as Lewisburg Academy and when the school closed during the US Civil War, it reopened in 1875 it split into two schools: the Greenbrier College for Women and the Greenbrier Military School. The Greenbrier College also went by the Lewisburg Female Institute and Lewisburg Female Seminary.

History 
Greenbrier College started as the Lewisburg Academy. Lewisburg Academy was established by Reverend John McElhenney in 1812 as the first school in Greenbrier County. The school closed during the Civil War and when it reopened in 1875 it split into two schools: the Greenbrier College for Women and the Greenbrier Military School.  Much of the school burned down in 1901. It was rebuilt in 1902. The school again burned in 1921.

List of known presidents 
John McElhenney (1812-) 
Dr. Matthew Lyle Lacy (1882-) 
Reverend John C. Brown (-1892) 
Rev. Robert L. Telford (1892-1911) 
Robert C. Sommerville (1911-1916) 
Robert H. Adams (1916-1919) 
Dora T. M. Biggs (1919-1920) 
John I. Armstrong (1920-1924) 
J. Marian Moore (1924-1925) 
French W. Thompson (1925-1952) 
Ralph Murray (1952-1954) 
John F. Montgomery (1954-1973)    

Telford, Armstrong, Thompson, and Murray all lived in the John A. North House when they served as presidents. Carnegie Hall was built as the music hall and department for the women's college with support from Andrew Carnegie. Many notable people, including Helen F. Holt, taught at the school. The school shut down in 1972 and sold it to the West Virginia State Department of Mental Health and became the Greenbrier Center. The North House museum was given to the Greenbrier Historical Society forming the Greenbrier Historical Society.  Carnegie Hall, Inc. was formed in 1983 to save the building from destruction and continues to serve the community. The main school buildings eventually became the New River Community and Technical College.

References 

Former women's universities and colleges in the United States
Defunct universities and colleges in West Virginia